Sabrina Valley is an ice-free valley between Pontes Ridge and Sabrina Ridge in the Britannia Range. Named in association with Sabrina Ridge by a University of Waikato geological party, 1978–79.

External links 

 Sabrina Valley on USGS website
 Sabrina Valley on SCAR website
 Sabrina Valley area map

References 

Valleys of Oates Land